Combined approval voting (CAV) is an electoral system where each voter may express approval, disapproval, or indifference toward each candidate. The winner is the most-approved candidate.

It is a cardinal system, a variation of score and approval voting, and is also known as dis&approval voting, balanced approval voting (BAV), approval with abstention option (AWAO), true weight voting (TWV1), or evaluative voting (EV) (though the latter can also be used for variants with more than 3 values.)  It has also been called net approval voting (though this term has a different definition in the context of approval-based committee selection).

Procedure 

Ballots contain a list of candidates, with 3 options next to each: "approve"/"disapprove"/"abstain", "for"/"against"/"neutral", or similar.  The ballot warns that blanks for a candidate are scored as "indifferent" votes.  Voters express their opinion of each candidate, and the votes are summed, with support = +1 and opposition = −1.  The candidate with the largest score is the winner.

It's also possible to use ballots with 2 options, "approve"/"disapprove" and treat blanks as abstentions.

Unlike approval voting, in which non-approval could mean either disapproval or indifference, CAV allows explicit expression of disapproval, which is hoped to increase turnout, and reduce spoiled/blank ballots and insincere votes for unviable candidates.  Some jurisdictions allow a "none of the above" option to express disapproval of all candidates, but ballots that allow disapproval of specific candidates are otherwise rare.

History 
CAV has been independently invented many times.  It was originally proposed by Dan Felsenthal in 1989. Claude Hillinger introduced the same concept in 2004 under the name "Evaluative Voting".  Alcantud and Laruelle gave it the name "Dis&approval voting" in 2012.

Properties 
As this is mathematically equivalent to 3-level score voting, it shares the same properties. For instance, it is always safe for a voter to approve their honest favorite (the favorite betrayal criterion).

While a (-1, 0, +1) scale is mathematically identical to a (0, 1, 2) scale, there are psychological differences between the two, and the introduction of negative ratings (combined with the change in scoring blanks as middle grades rather than lowest grades) changes the scores that candidates receive in each system.  Studies of French voters in 2012 found that, while the highest-rated candidate was the same under either system, and the grades of "exclusive" (polarizing) candidates were relatively unchanged, there were slight increases in the scores of "inclusive" (broadly-liked) candidates, and large increases in the scores of lesser-known candidates.

Unlike other score voting scales, CAV is compatible with existing voting machines that can handle voting for/against ballot initiatives.

References 

Electoral systems
Cardinal electoral systems